Monteview is an unincorporated community in Jefferson County, Idaho, United States.

History
Monteview's population was just 10 in 1960.

References

Unincorporated communities in Jefferson County, Idaho
Unincorporated communities in Idaho